Eric Owen Parry  (born 24 March 1952) is a British architect, designer, writer and educator. Parry is the founder and principal of Eric Parry Architects established in London in 1983. His built work includes the restoration and renewal of St Martin-in-the-Fields in London, the Holburne Museum in Bath, 50 New Bond Street, 23 Savile Row, One Eagle Place in Piccadilly, Aldermanbury Square by London Wall, 30 Finsbury Square in London, and the London Stock Exchange. His projects also include a number of residential developments. Eric Parry's architectural work and design has been shown internationally on major exhibitions, including the Royal Academy of Arts, the British School at Rome, and the 2012 Venice Biennale of Architecture.

Personal life

Born in Kuwait City, Kuwait on 24 March 1952, to British parents Marion and Eric Parry, Parry's father was Chief Medical Officer in the Kuwaiti health service between 1948 and 1962. In his book Context: Architecture and the Genius of Place (2015), Parry alludes to his memories of growing up in Kuwait within sight of the nomadic life of Bedouin tribes. Later moving to Britain, Parry was educated at Shrewsbury School. From 1970, he attended Newcastle University School of Architecture, Planning and Landscape, graduating with a Bachelor of Arts' degree in Architecture in 1973. He later registered with the Royal College of Arts, where he obtained his Master of Arts in 1978. Parry completed his formal architectural education at the Architectural Association School of Architecture, where he was taught by Dalibor Vesely and Peter Carl, both of whom he would again later encounter while teaching in Cambridge. Parry obtained his Diploma in Architecture by the Architectural Association in 1980. He taught at the Cambridge Department of Architecture from 1983 to 1997, as a Lecturer in architecture. Parry was conferred an honorary Master of Arts by the University of Cambridge, and is a member of Peterhouse, Cambridge. In 2006, Parry was elected at the Royal Academy of Arts, and in 2012 received the degree of Doctor of Arts Honoris Causa from the University of Bath.

Professional life
Eric Parry began his professional life as a Lecturer at the Department of Architecture, University of Cambridge from 1983 to 1997. Since then he has taught at numerous universities, including the Graduate School of Design, Harvard University, the University of Houston and the Tokyo Institute of Technology, Japan. He founded Eric Parry Architects in London in 1983. His early work included Artists' Studios in London for Antony Gormley and Tom Phillips, completed in 1988, as well as a private rehabilitation of the Château de Paulin in Tarn, France, which included the work of sculptor Stephen Cox. From this period dates also his masterplan for Pembroke College, Cambridge that was followed in 1993 by the project for the College's New Lodge and Student Accommodation. This was accompanied by a number of invited competition entries, namely for the extension of the Fitzwilliam Museum, Cambridge (1993), and to rebuild St George's Hall, Windsor Castle after the fire of 1992.

Parry's body of work also includes the corporate and commercial projects for W3 Stockley Park, completed in 1991, additional offices and conference rooms for the Royal Lancaster Hotel, London, and a complex of apartments for Damai Suria, Kuala Lumpur, Malaysia, completed in 1997.
This work led to further commissions, such as the office buildings in London for 30 Finsbury Square, completed in 2002 as well as 23 Savile Row, 60 Threadneedle Street, 50 New Bond Street, all of which were completed in 2009. This involvement with the corporate world included the project for the new London Stock Exchange.
At the same time, on the historical and educational fronts Parry developed a number of projects for schools, from the Bedford School Library and Music School to Wells Cathedral School Cedar's Hall completed in 2017. The cultural side to the practice is reflected in Parry's projects for London art galleries such as the Timothy Taylor Gallery in Dering Street and Carlos Place, as well as the restoration and renewal of St Martin-in-the-Fields, completed in 2008, and the Holburne Museum in Bath, Somerset.
Parry's later work includes the residential building N10 for the East Village, London, formerly Olympic Village during the London 2012 Games.
In 2013, Parry's completion of One Eagle Place, Piccadilly, was announced in the press, featuring a cornice by Turner Prize winner, artist Richard Deacon. The news was followed by Parry's completion of the neighbouring 8 St James's Square, a building that broke the UK office rent record.

Work
The following projects are listed in Eric Parry Architects' monographs Volume 1 (2002), Volume 2 (2011) and Volume 3 (2015):

Completed

 1986 ‒ Animation Graphic Design Studios, London
 1986–1988 ‒ Artists' Studios, London
 1987–2002 ‒ Château de Paulin, Tarn, France, with sculptor Stephen Cox
 1988 ‒ Offices for Stanhope, London
 1988–1990 ‒ Ferry House, South Cambridgeshire
 1989–1991 ‒ Office Building, W3 Stockley Park, London
 1989–1991 ‒ Market Rasen, Lincolnshire
 1990 ‒ 'Rediscovering the Public Realm', exhibition, Heinz Gallery, RIBA
 1990–2005 ‒ Old Wardour House, Wiltshire
 1991 ‒ Earl Place, London, entrance
 1991 ‒ Lipton Residence, London
 1990–2005 ‒ Old Wardour House, Wiltshire
 1993–1997 ‒ Pembroke College, Cambridge, New Lodge and Student Accommodation Building
 1994 ‒ Ministry of Sound, London
 1994–1996 ‒ Sussex Innovation Centre, Falmer, East Sussex, England
 1995 ‒ Offices, Tras Street, Singapore
 1996 ‒ Offices, Stornaway House, London
 1996–1997 ‒ Damai Suria Apartments, Kuala Lumpur, Malaysia
 1997 ‒ Agace Residence, London
 1997–2004 ‒ Wimbledon School of Art, London
 1997 ‒ Offices for Stanhope, London
 1997–1998 ‒ Taylor Residence, London
 1997–1999 ‒ Southwark Gateway, London
 1997–2000 ‒ Mandarin Oriental Hyde Park, London
 1997–2004 ‒ Wimbledon School of Art, London
 1997–2004 ‒ Royal Lancaster Hotel, London
 1998 ‒ Fashion Store, King's Road, London
 1999–2002 ‒ 30 Finsbury Square, London
 1999–2002 ‒ London Residence
 1999–2003 – London Stock Exchange, 10 Paternoster Square, London
 1998–2008 ‒ Granta Park, Amenity Building, South Cambridgeshire
 1999–2001 ‒ London Bridge Environs, London
 1999–2002 ‒ Offices, 30 Finsbury Square, London
 2000 ‒ Mandarin Oriental Hotel Spa, Hyde Park, London
 2000–2004 ‒ Gresham Street
 2001–2003 ‒ Bedford School, Library
 2001–2009 ‒ 23 Savile Row, London
 2001–2007 ‒ 5 Aldermanbury Square, London
 2002 ‒ Norfolk House, St. James's Square, London
 2002–2005 ‒ Bedford School Music School, Bedford, England
 2002–2008 ‒ St Martin-in-the-Fields, London
 2002–2011 ‒ Holburne Museum, Bath, England
 2003 ‒ Timothy Taylor Gallery, Dering Street, London
 2004–2006 ‒ Aldermanbury Square, Landscape, London
 2004–2009 ‒ 60 Threadneedle Street, London
 2004–2009 ‒ 50 New Bond Street and 14 St George Street, London
 2004–2010 ‒ Four Seasons Hotel Spa, Park Lane, London
 2005–2010 ‒ Lyall Mews Residence, London
 2005–2012 ‒ Lipton Residence, London
 2005 ‒ Selfridges Entrances, London
 2008 ‒ Chelsfield, London, offices
 2006–2007 ‒ Babcock & Brown, London, offices
 2006–2007 ‒ Timothy Taylor Gallery, Carlos Place, Mayfair, London
 2008–2009 ‒ 'Palladio', exhibition, Royal Academy of Arts, London
 2008–2012 ‒ N10 East Village (formerly Olympic Village), London
 2008–2013 ‒ One Eagle Place, Piccadilly, London, with Richard Deacon
 2012-2019 ‒ 120 Fenchurch Street, London (One Fen Court)

Under construction
 2007 ‒ Cedars Hall, Wells Cathedral School, Somerset, England
 2009 ‒ Brighton College Music and Drama Schools, Brighton, England
 2010 ‒ 26 Albemarle Street, London

Proposals
 1988 ‒ Pembroke College, Cambridge, masterplan
 1989 ‒ Playground, Porto Carras, Chalkidiki, Greece
 1989–1991 ‒ The Club Building, Chiswick Park, London
 1990 ‒ Corpus Christi College, Cambridge, Graduate Accommodation
 1990–1991 ‒ Pembroke College, Cambridge, Theatre
 1992 ‒ Masterplan, Norfolk and Norwich, General District Hospital
 1993 ‒ Fitzwilliam Museum, Cambridge
 1993 ‒ St George's Hall, Windsor Castle
 1993 ‒ Sports Hall, Leytonstone School, London
 1994 ‒ The Ritz Hotel, Feasibility Study, London
 1996 ‒ Bus Station 1, Walsall, West Midlands, England
 1996–1999 ‒ Granta Park Masterplan, South Cambridgeshire
 1996–2009 ‒ Iringan Hijau, Kuala Lumpur, Malaysia
 1997 ‒ Royal Lancaster, London
 1998 ‒ Westlakes Innovation Centre, Cumbria
 1998 ‒ Royal Academy of Arts, London
 1999 ‒ Lambeth Gateway, London
 2001 ‒ Turner Contemporary, Margate, Kent, England
 2001–2003 ‒ Royal Garden Clubhouse, Shanghai
 2002–2005 ‒ Metropole Building and 10 Whitehall Place
 2003 ‒ Millbank, Aberdeenshire, masterplan
 2003 ‒ King's Cross Central, London
 2003 ‒ 185 Park Street, London
 2004 ‒ Grosvenor Waterside
 2004 ‒ Boathouse 4, Portsmouth Historic Dockyard, Portsmouth
 2005–2007 ‒ 7 & 8 St James's Square, London
 2006 ‒ Mana Residence, Notting Hill, London
 2006 ‒ The Selfridge Hotel, Oxford Street, London

Design
Parry's work as a designer has accompanied his projects for the Sebastian + Barquet furniture gallery and Iringan Hijau in Kuala Lumpur which featured the Z-handles and Z-levers. Parry also designed furniture for the Timothy Taylor Gallery, the Timothy Taylor Table, and for the Four Seasons Hotel Spa in Park Lane. The practice also boasts two series of Vigilia Benches and Sanctuary Benches designed by Parry for St Martin-in-the-Fields. A Holburne Museum Bench was also designed for the Holburne Museum.

Books
In 2015, Eric Parry published Context: Architecture and the Genius of Place describing his approach to architecture. Parry previously published two monographs on the practice's work, Volume 1 and Volume 2, with texts by Dalibor Vesely and Wilfried Wang. By the beginning of 2016, a Volume 3 was released, featuring an introduction by Dalibor Vesely and with main text by Edwin Heathcote.

Short films
Parry has produced two series of short films reflecting on the City of Westminster and the City of London, as well as on the Holburne Museum in Bath, and on the construction of 4 Pancras Square.
Parry has also hosted a series of seminars documented in film with Joseph Rykwert, Dalibor Vesely, Robin Middleton, Peter Carl, Alberto Pérez-Gómez and David Leatherbarrow.

Awards
 RIBA Award for Wells Cathedral School, Wells (2017)
 RIBA Award for The Welding Institute, Cambridge (2017)
 Civic Voice Design Awards – Special Conservation Area Award for Wells Cathedral School, Wells (2017)
 Civic Trust Commendation for 8 St James’s Square, London (2017)
 Civic Trust Commendation for Brighton College Music School, Brighton (2017)
 RIBA South West Award – Building of the Year for Wells Cathedral School, Wells (2017)
 RIBA London Awards for 5–7 St Helen’s Place with The Leathersellers’ Hall, London (2017)
 RIBA East Award for The Welding Institute, Cambridge (2017)
 RIBA South West Award for Brighton College Music School, Brighton (2017)
 RIBA Award (London Region) for 8 St James’s Square, London (2016)
 Construction News Awards Finalist (Project of the Year) for 8 St James’s Square, London (2016)
 Sussex Heritage Trust Awards (Public and Community) for Brighton College Music School, Brighton (2016)
 City of London Building of the Year – Livery Award Commendation for The Leathersellers’ Hall, London (2016)
 The Stone Federation, National Stone Awards’ Commendation (Sustainability) for One Eagle Place, Piccadilly (2015)
 RICS Awards – Highly Commended (Commercial) for One Eagle Place, Piccadilly (2014)
 UK Property Awards (Mixed Use Development) for One Eagle Place, Piccadilly (2014)
 British Council for Offices – BCO Award (Best Commercial Workspace in London and the South East) for One Eagle Place, Piccadilly (2014)
 Doctor of Arts Honoris Causa by the University of Bath (2012)
 RIBA Award for The Holburne Museum, Bath (2012)
 RIBA Award – The Four Seasons Hotel Spa, Park Lane, London (2012)
 RIBA Award – 50 New Bond Street, London (2012)
 AJ Retrofit Awards for The Holburne Museum, Bath, 'Building of the Year' (2012)
 Pertubuhan Akitek Malaysia Award for Iringan Hijau, Kuala Lumpur (2011)
 RIBA Award for 60 Threadneedle Street, London (2010)
 Europa Nostra Conservation Award for St Martin-in-the-Fields, London (2010)
 Elected to the Royal Academy of Arts (2006)
 Shortlisted for the Stirling Prize for 30 Finsbury Square, London (2003)
 Design Excellence Award for 30 Finsbury Square, London (2003)
 Civic Trust Award Commendation for Granta Park, Cambridgeshire (2003)
 British Council for Offices – BCO Award Commendation for 30 Finsbury Square, London (2003)
 BCIA Award High Commendation for 30 Finsbury Square, London (2003)
 Natural Stone Awards Commendation for The Mandarin Oriental Hotel Spa, London (2002)
 FX Design Awards for The Spa at the Mandarin Oriental Hotel, London (2001)
 Natural Stone Awards for Southwark Gateway, London (2000)
 Natural Stone Awards High Commendation for Pembroke College, Cambridge (2000)
 RIBA Award for Southwark Gateway, Tooley Street, London (1999)
 Pertubuhan Akitek Malaysia Award for Damai Suria, Kuala Lumpur (with C'Arch) (1999)
 Civic Trust Award Commendation for Pembroke College, Cambridge (1999)
 RIBA Award for Foundress Court, Pembroke College, Cambridge (1998)

Bibliography
 Parry, Eric, Context: Architecture and the Genius of Place (Wiley, 2015) 
 Parry, Eric; Vesely, Dalibor and Wang, Wilfried, Eric Parry Architects: Volume 1 (Black Dog, 2002 and 2011) 
 Parry, Eric; Vesely, Dalibor and Wang, Wilfried, Eric Parry Architects: Volume 2 (Black Dog, 2011) 
 Parry, Eric; Vesely, Dalibor and Heathcote, Edwin, Eric Parry Architects: Volume 3 (Artifice Books, 2015)

References

External links

Eric Parry Designs
Royal Academy of Arts
Royal Institute of British Architects
 Profile on Royal Academy of Arts Collections

1952 births
Architects from London
Royal Academicians
Alumni of Newcastle University
Alumni of the Royal College of Art
Academics of the University of Cambridge
Living people